Somewhere in... blog (also known as Samu) is a Bengali blogging website. বাঁধ ভাঙার আওয়াজ or Voice of breaking obstacle is the slogan of the blog. It is the first public blogging site in Bengali established in 2005 and the largest community of Bengali bloggers in the world. It provides free blog posting for registered users. Registration is optional to read on blogs hosted on the site. Registration is required to post in or to comment on the post. Somewhere in blog was banned for eight months.

Founders 
Syeda Gulshan Ferdous Jana and her husband Arild Klokkerhaug are the founder of the blog. She is the editor of Somewhere in... blog. Site's programmer Hasin Hayder developed a Bengali phonetic keyboard which is the first tool to write in Bengali using an English keyboard. The number of active bloggers are over 10,000.

Activities 
 Want trial of war criminals
 Protest for justice of Murder of Sagar Sarowar and Meherun Runi
 Celebration of Bengali Blog Day (19 December)

Moderation 
For bloggers of this site, there are four types of moderation status. They are safe, general, watch, and blocked. Moderators of this blog are also known as Modu. Post syndications are fully controlled by Moderators and Administrators.

See also 
 Bangladesh Telecommunication Regulatory Commission

References

External links 
 

Internet properties established in 2005
Bangladeshi websites